Mount Hope Cemetery is a historic cemetery in southern Boston, Massachusetts, between the neighborhoods of Roslindale and Mattapan.

Description and history
Mount Hope was established in 1852 as a private cemetery, and was acquired by the city five years later. It was the city's first cemetery to be laid out in the rural cemetery style, with winding lanes. Its main entrance is on Walk Hill Street, on the northern boundary. The cemetery's office building was designed by Boston architect James Mulcahy.

The cemetery was added to the National Register of Historic Places on September 25, 2009.

In May 2020, the remains of fifty victims of infectious diseases, including smallpox, typhus, yellow fever, syphilis, and other diseases, were removed from the cemetery on Gallops Island in Boston Harbor where they were threatened by storm damage and reinterred in the Graceland section of Mount Hope. Their identities are unknown; they died between 1871 and 1902 and the fifty include people of African, Asian, and European origin.

In October 2021, a new memorial headstone for African American Civil War nurse Susie King Taylor was dedicated in a ceremony sponsored by the Massachusetts Sons of Union Veterans of the Civil War and attended by Boston mayor Kim Janey. Originally, the grave marker only contained her second husband's name, Russell Taylor (1854-1901); cemetery records indicate that she was buried with him in 1912. The new stone includes Taylor's name as well as an inscription of her likeness.

Notable interments

 Medal of Honor recipients
 David J. Campbell (1874–1955), Spanish-American War
 Leonard Chadwick (1878–1940), Spanish-American War
 Henry Hendrickson (1862–1912), Spanish-American War
 Frank Elmer Smith (1864–1943), China Relief Expedition
 William Spicer (1864–1949), Spanish-American War
 Other noted persons 
 George Dixon (1870–1908), first Canadian and first black world boxing champion.
 Gottlieb Graupner (1767–1836), musician
 The Grimké sisters
 Angelina Grimké (1805–1879), abolitionist and women's rights advocate
 Sarah Moore Grimké (1792–1873), abolitionist and women's right advocate
 Rudolf Haffenreffer (1847–1929), German-American brewer
 Roland Hayes (1887–1977), lyric tenor, first African American to sing at Carnegie Hall
 Will “Cannonball” Jackman (1895–1972), Negro League baseball player
 Luther "Snake Boy" Johnson (died 1976), American Chicago blues and electric blues guitarist, singer and songwriter.
 Abrey Kamoo (1815–1904), Tunisian-born American physician and Civil War nurse
 John Edward Kelly (1839–1884), Irish Revolutionary
 Michael "King" Kelly (1857–1894), Hall of Fame baseball player
Thomas W. Piper (1849–1876), Canadian-born serial killer "The Boston Belfry Murderer" 
 Susie King Taylor (1848–1912), first African American to teach openly in a school for former slaves, first black Army nurse
 Mary Ella Waller (1855–1938), novelist 
 Theodore Dwight Weld (1803–1895), abolitionist

See also
 National Register of Historic Places listings in southern Boston, Massachusetts

References

External links
 
 

Cemeteries on the National Register of Historic Places in Massachusetts
Cemeteries in Boston
National Register of Historic Places in Boston
Cemeteries established in the 1850s
1852 establishments in Massachusetts